Adrian Bowden (born 12 October 1947) is a former Australian rules footballer who played for the Melbourne Football Club in the Victorian Football League (VFL).

Notes

External links 

1947 births
Living people
Australian rules footballers from Tasmania
Melbourne Football Club players